"Lost Without You" is a song by Norwegian record producer and DJ Kygo with Australian singer and songwriter Dean Lewis. It was released on 8 July 2022, and serves as the second collaboration between the two after "Never Really Loved Me", released a week before.

Reception
Ryan From from We Rave You said "While it maintains an upbeat nature, the newest of the two sublime productions tells a heart-wrenching love story as Lewis drives home raw emotion with his dulcet tones and poignant lyricism. Add to that the meticulous piano and guitar melodies typical of Kygo and we are left with another soft and serene dance record that pulls on the heartstrings."

Music video
The music video for "Lost Without You" was filmed in Norway and directed by Johannes Lovund, serving as a continuation of "Never Really Loved Me"'s lyric video. The clip follows the relationship of the two main characters (played by Kygo and model Meredith Mickelson) as they go from childhood sweethearts to adults, culminating in a heartbreaking end.

Charts

Weekly charts

Year-end charts

References

2022 singles
2022 songs
RCA Records singles
Kygo songs
Dean Lewis songs
Music videos shot in Norway
Song recordings produced by Kygo
Songs written by Kygo
Songs written by Dean Lewis